Pleurodonte nigrescens is a species of  tropical air-breathing land snail, a pulmonate gastropod mollusk in the family Pleurodontidae.

Distribution 
The distribution of Pleurodonte nigrescens includes:
 Guadeloupe
 Dominica

Description 
Pleurodonte nigrescens differs from all other Dominican Pleurodonte species by the characteristic parietal tooth opposite the basal teeth in the aperture. The shell can be chesnut-brown with fine axial lines or purple-black with a purple aperture.

Ecology 
Pleurodonte nigrescens lives in damp leaf litter on the forest floor. This species appears to prefer relatively undisturbed habitats, especially in rain forest at higher altitudes in Dominica.

References
This article incorporates CC-BY-3.0 text from the reference 

Pleurodontidae
Gastropods described in 1828